Albert Rudomine (27 April 1892 in Kiev, Russian Empire - 4 April 1975 in Paris) was a French photographer perhaps best known for his nudes.

After a time spent studying Hebrew in New York, Rudomine settled in Paris in 1917. He worked first as a dressmaker before working as a photojournalist for L'Illustration in 1920 and opening a photographic studio in 1923.

Collections 

 Collection Christian Bouqueret
 Bibliothèque nationale de France
 Cleveland Museum of Art
J. Paul Getty Museum
Museum of Modern Art
Department of Image Collections, National Gallery of Art of Art Library
 Metropolitan Museum of Art
Centre Pompidou
Musée Carnavalet
Musée Cantini, Marseilles
Musée Bourdelle
Musée des beaux-arts du Canada

Exhibitions 
 Albert Rudomine, Rencontres de la photographie, Arles, France, 1983
 Vente aux enchères chez Tajan, 2003
 Galerie Michèle Chomette (collective), Paris, 2004
 Galerie Léon Herschtritt (collective), Paris, 2006
 Galerie Johannes Faber, Vienne

External links 
 Biographical note

1892 births
1975 deaths
French photographers
Emigrants from the Russian Empire to France